The 1st Northern Provincial Council is the current meeting of the Northern Provincial Council, with the membership determined by the results of the 2013 provincial council election held on 21 September 2013. The council met for the first time on 25 October 2013. According to the Constitution of Sri Lanka the maximum term of a provincial council is 5 years from the date of its first meeting.

Election

The 1st Northern Provincial Council election was held on 21 September 2013. The Tamil National Alliance (TNA), the largest party representing the Sri Lankan Tamils, won 30 of the 38 seats. The United People's Freedom Alliance (UPFA), which was in power nationally, became the second largest group after winning 7 seats. The Sri Lanka Muslim Congress (SLMC) won the remaining seat.

Results

The new provincial council met for the first time on 25 October 2013. C. V. K. Sivagnanam (TNA-ITAK) and Anton Jeyanathan (TNA-ITAK) were elected unopposed as Chairman and Deputy Chairman respectively.

Government/Board of Ministers

C. V. Vigneswaran was appointed Chief Minister by Governor G. A. Chandrasiri on 1 October 2013. Vigneswaran took his oath as chief minister and provincial councillor in front of President Mahinda Rajapaksa at the Presidential Secretariat on 7 October 2013. The four other ministers took their oaths in front of Vigneswaran at Veerasingam Hall on 11 October 2013: P. Ayngaranesan (TNA-EPRLF); B. Deniswaran (TNA-TELO); T. Kurukularajah (TNA-ITAK); and P. Sathiyalingam (TNA-ITAK).

Deaths and resignations
The 1st provincial council saw the following deaths and resignations:
 7 April 2014: K. Kamalendran (UPFA-JAF) forfeited his seat after ceasing to be a member of the UPFA. He was replaced by S. Thavarajah (UPFA-JAF) on 9 April 2014.
 17 February 2015: K. Swami Veerabahu (TNA-MUL) died. He was replaced by K. Sivanesan (TNA-MUL) on 30 April 2015.
 18 February 2015: Mary Kamala Gunaseelan (TNA-BON) resigned. Her replacement M. P. Nadarajah (TNA-BON) was sworn in on 7 April 2015.
 25 August 2015: D. Siddarthan (TNA-JAF) and S. Sivamohan (TNA-MUL) forfeited their seat after being elected to Parliament. Their replacements, K. Tharmalingam (TNA-JAF) and V. Kamaleswaran (TNA-MUL), were sworn in on 18 September 2015.
 10 September 2015: Angajan Ramanathan (UPFA-JAF) forfeited his seat after being appointed to Parliament. He was replaced by S. Agilathas (UPFA-JAF) on 24 September 2015.
 11 May 2016: M. P. Nadarajah (TNA-BON) resigned. He was replaced by S. Mayuran (TNA-BON) on 5 July 2016.
 1 October 2016: Anton Jeyanathan (TNA-MUL) died. He was replaced by A. Povaneswaran (TNA-MUL) on 9 December 2016.
 2017: S. Mayuran (TNA-BON) resigned. His replacement R. Jeyasekaram (TNA-BON) was sworn in on 2 August 2017.
 6 October 2017: Rifkhan Bathiudeen (UPFA-MAN) resigned. He was replaced by Alikhan Shariff.
 14 December 2017: E. Arnold (TNA-JAF) resigned. He was replaced by Sabaratnam Kugathas.
 December 2017: S. M. Rasik (SLMC-MAN) resigned. He was replaced by A. N. S. Mohamed.

Members

References
 
 
 
 
 

2013 establishments in Sri Lanka
Northern Provincial Council